
Gmina Rudnik is a rural gmina (administrative district) in Racibórz County, Silesian Voivodeship, in southern Poland.

Villages
Gmina Rudnik contains the villages and settlements of Brzeźnica, Czerwięcice, Dolędzin, Gacki, Gamów, Grzegorzowice, Jastrzębie, Kolonia Strzybnik, Lasaki, Ligota Książęca, Łubowice, Modzurów, Ponięcice, Rudnik, Sławienko, Sławików, Strzybniczek, Strzybnik and Szonowice.

Neighbouring gminas
Gmina Rudnik is bordered by the town of Racibórz and by the gminas of Baborów, Cisek, Kuźnia Raciborska, Nędza, Pietrowice Wielkie and Polska Cerekiew.

Gallery

References

Rudnik
Gmina Rudnik